William Roberts Elliott Burley (3 January 1899 – 1976) was an English professional footballer who played as an inside forward.

References

1899 births
1976 deaths
Sportspeople from Devonport, Plymouth
English footballers
Association football inside forwards
Torquay Town F.C. players
Torquay United F.C. players
Swansea City A.F.C. players
Peterborough & Fletton United F.C. players
Grimsby Town F.C. players
Millwall F.C. players
Norwich City F.C. players
English Football League players